Sautet is a surname. Notable people with the surname include:

Claude Sautet (1924–2000), French author and film director
Frédéric Sautet (born 1968), French economist
Marc Sautet (1947–1998), French writer, teacher, translator, and philosopher
Philippe Sautet (born 1961), French chemist